William Young Wilson (13 December 1909 – 30 September 1976) was an Australian sportsman who played first-class cricket with Victoria and Australian rules football for Essendon in the Victorian Football League (VFL).

Nicknamed 'Weary', Wilson was recruited to Essendon from Ascot Vale Presbyterians and made his VFL debut in 1932. After 30 games he left Essendon and turned his attention to cricket and played three first-class cricket matches in the 1935/36 season. He was a right-arm fast-medium pace bowler and took seven wickets at 38.28 in those matches. His best performance came in a Sheffield Shield encounter against South Australia at the Adelaide Oval when he took 3/122 in the first innings.

See also
 List of Victoria first-class cricketers

References

External links

Cricinfo: William Wilson

1909 births
1976 deaths
Australian cricketers
Victoria cricketers
Australian rules footballers from Melbourne
Essendon Football Club players
People from Moonee Ponds, Victoria
Cricketers from Melbourne